Rail transport in Latvia is done on  Russian gauge. The main railway company is the state-owned Latvijas dzelzceļš (LDz), with its subsidiary Pasažieru vilciens (PV) providing passenger services.

Historically Latvia had lot of different rail gauges, most notably  standard gauge and  narrow gauge. These were gradually replaced by the Russian gauge after the Soviet occupation of the Baltic states. 

The Rail Baltica project aims to connect Latvia and the other Baltic states to the European standard gauge by approximately 2030. Ten regional stations are planned in the section from Bauska to Salacgrīva.

Although PV has been a monopolist in passenger train, in February 2022 the Road Transport Administration of the Ministry of Transport of Latvia announced the first market survey on potential private rail passenger service providers.

Rail links to adjacent countries
(Estonia) – yes  
(Lithuania) – no

See also 
 History of rail transport in Latvia
 Narrow gauge railways in Latvia
 Rail Baltica
 Transport in Latvia

References

External links
 
 New direct train from Kyiv to Latvia
 "Latvia registered the largest increase with +368.9 %.."